Bud Tingelstad (April 4, 1928 – July 30, 1981) was an American racecar driver.

Born in Frazee, Minnesota, Tingelstad drove in the USAC Championship Car series, racing in the 1960–1971 seasons with 120 starts, including the Indianapolis 500 in each year except 1961 and 1970, attempting, but failing to qualify in both of those years and also attempting to qualify in 1972. His best Indy 500 finish was sixth in 1964.  He had 56 top-ten race finishes, with his one victory in 1966 at DuQuoin. He had a best Championship points finish of 5th in 1964. He died of a heart attack in Indianapolis, Indiana.

Complete USAC Championship Car results

Indy 500 results

World Championship career summary
The Indianapolis 500 was part of the FIA World Championship from 1950 through 1960. Drivers competing at Indy during those years were credited with World Championship points and participation. Bud Tingelstad participated in 1 World Championship race but scored no World Championship points.

External links
Bud Tingelstad at ChampCarStats

1928 births
1981 deaths
American people of Norwegian descent
Champ Car drivers
Indianapolis 500 drivers
People from Becker County, Minnesota
Racing drivers from Minnesota
USAC Silver Crown Series drivers